This is a selected list of notable massively multiplayer online games which are free-to-play in some form without ever requiring a subscription or other payment. These are commonly MMORPGs or MMOFPSs, but could be of any genre.

Free play 
These MMOGs provide client software free of charge and allow users to play the game without requiring payment. The games' expenses are typically funded by sponsors or through donations (which have no effect in the game itself).

Free play with advertising 
These MMOGs are free to play. They are funded through advertising, either in-game or through pop-ups.

Free play with micro-transactions
These MMOGs are free to play, but players may optionally purchase in-game items or currency.

Optional paid subscriptions
These MMOGs offer optional additional game content through paid subscription, but are otherwise free to play.

See also 
List of massively multiplayer online games
 List of free multiplayer online games
 List of MMORPGs
 List of multiplayer browser games
 Multiplayer video game
 Browser based game

References

MMOG
list
list
Free-to-play video games
Freeware games